Serhiy Pohorilyi (born 28 July 1986) is a professional Ukrainian football goalkeeper who plays in Georgia for Samtredia.

Career
Initially selected for the game against the Bulgaria national football team on 14 November 2012, he was withdrawn from the national team squad on the decision of the National Team Committee of the Football Federation of Ukraine on 2 November 2012 due to a bad conduct.

In the summer of 2016, he signed a contract with the Norwegian club Bodø/Glimt.

Career statistics

References

External links
 Official Website Profile
 
 

1986 births
Sportspeople from Kyiv
Living people
Ukrainian footballers
Association football goalkeepers
FC Podillya Khmelnytskyi players
FC Obolon-2 Kyiv players
FC CSKA Kyiv players
FC Arsenal Kyiv players
SC Tavriya Simferopol players
FC Metalist Kharkiv players
FK Bodø/Glimt players
FC Helios Kharkiv players
FC Samtredia players
Ukrainian Premier League players
Ukrainian First League players
Ukrainian Second League players
Eliteserien players
Erovnuli Liga players
Ukrainian expatriate footballers
Expatriate footballers in Norway
Ukrainian expatriate sportspeople in Norway
Expatriate footballers in Georgia (country)
Ukrainian expatriate sportspeople in Georgia (country)